Chondrocidaris brevispina, the raspberry sea urchin, is a species of sea urchins of the family Cidaridae. Their armour is covered with short, conical spines. 

Chondrocidaris brevispina was first scientifically described in 1925 by Hubert Lyman Clark.

References 

Animals described in 1925
Cidaridae
Taxa named by Hubert Lyman Clark